Trần Thị Thanh Nhàn (born 1982), better known as Lý Nhã Kỳ is a Vietnamese actress, model and  businesswoman. She is known for portraying Diem Kieu in VTV's series Kiều nữ và đại gia (The beauty and the wealthy). Since 2011, she has been serving as the Tourism ambassador  of Vietnam. She was also ambassador for Operation Smile in Vietnam.

Aside from her native tongue Vietnamese, Kỳ is also fluent in English, German, and Mandarin Chinese,

Filmography

Endorsement
 Mercedes-Benz
 Avon Products

References

External links
  Official Website
  Entreprise of Lý Nhã Kỳ
Tại sao Lý Nhã Kỳ trở thành Đại sứ du lịch Việt Nam? - QĐND

1982 births
Living people
People from Bà Rịa-Vũng Tàu Province
21st-century Vietnamese actresses
Vietnamese businesspeople
Vietnamese film actresses
Vietnamese child actresses